Söğütlü can refer to:

 Söğütlü
 Söğütlü, Aziziye
 Söğütlü, Ayvacık
 Söğütlü, Bartın
 Söğütlü, Bayburt
 Söğütlü, Çilimli
 Söğütlü, Çukurova
 Söğütlü, Hınıs
 Söğütlü, Otlukbeli
 Söğütlü, Refahiye
 Söğütlü Athletics Stadium